This is a list of people who have served as Lord-Lieutenant of West Midlands since the creation of that office on 1 April 1974.

Charles Ian Finch-Knightley, 11th Earl of Aylesford 1 April 1974 – 1993
 Sir Robert Richard Taylor 16 December 1993 – 2007
 Paul Sabapathy, CBE 2007–2015
 Sir John Crabtree OBE, 3 January 2017 – present

References

West Midlands
 
1974 establishments in England